Ruari James Crichard (born 9 January 1995) is a cricketer who played first-class cricket for Cambridge University from 2015 to 2017.

Crichard attended King's College School, Wimbledon, before going up to St John's College, Cambridge, where he studied modern and medieval languages. An opening bowler, in the 2017 University Match he took 5 for 74 and 6 for 68 in Cambridge’s 216-run victory. After the match he announced that he would be playing no more first-class cricket. He took up a position with the JMAN Group management consultancy in London.

References

External links
 
 Ruari Crichard at CricketArchive

1995 births
Living people
People from Hammersmith
People educated at King's College School, London
Alumni of St John's College, Cambridge
English cricketers
Cambridge University cricketers
Cambridge MCCU cricketers